The first elections to Sutherland County Council were held in February 1890 as part of the wider 1890 local elections. County councils had been created in Scotland by the Local Government (Scotland) Act 1889, following on from the Local Government Act 1888 which had created them in England and Wales.

The election took place at a time of great change in Sutherland. The Crofters' Holdings (Scotland) Act 1886 had established the first Crofters Commission, which acted as a land court which ruled on disputes between landlords and crofters. The largest land owner in the county was the Duke of Sutherland, who owned the Sutherland estate, comprising most of the county.

To ensure the Duke's interest was represented on the new council all of the Sutherlands estates factors stood for election, along with James Gordon; the Assynt sub-factor. The estate anticipated defeat in the election having lost control of School and Poor boards in the early 1880s. Ultimately only Donald MacLean won a seat on behalf of the Sutherland interest. Despite having been anticipated, the estate was shocked by the scale of their loss, which they blamed on local land leaguers, merchants, ministers, and school teachers, as well as the fact that the vote was no longer secret. Evander McIver, a Lewis-man and factor for Scourie, complained that the new council was "formed of Radicals, Land Leaguers, and troublesome Clericals!"

MacLean, with the Dukes consent, stepped down before the elections in 1892 after complaining his presence was a waste of time as he was supported by no other members, and there was little prospect of additional representatives for the estate being returned.

Council results

In addition to the elected members the council also included Bailie Gunn, representing the burgh of Dornoch. The ex-officio members were the Duke of Sutherland, Lord Stafford, Sheriff Mackenzie, and a Mr Barclay of Skelbo.

Ward results

Assynt East

Assynt West

Clyne

Creich East

Creich West

Dornoch East

Dornoch West

Durness

Eddrachillis

Farr

Golspie East

Golspie West

Kildonan West

Kildonan South

Lairg

Loth

Reay

Rogart

Tongue

References

November 1890 events
1890 Scottish local elections
Council elections in Scotland